Amakusa is a series of islands belonging to Japan.

Amakusa may also refer to:

 Amakusa, Kumamoto, Japan
 Amakusa, Kumamoto (town), Japan
 Amakusa Airfield, a Japanese airport
 Amakusa Airlines, a Japanese airline based at the airport of the same name
 Amakusa District, Kumamoto, Japan
 Amakusa Shirō ( 1621 – 1638), Japanese Roman Catholic martyr
 Japanese escort ship Amakusa, an Etorofu-class escort ship of the Imperial Japanese Navy
 JS Amakusa, a Hiuchi-class support ship of the Japanese Maritime Self-Defense Force
 Yuki Sato (born 1985), Japanese professional wrestler known under the ring name Amakusa